"Alone with You" is a song written by Shane McAnally, Catt Gravitt and J. T. Harding, and recorded by American country music artist Jake Owen.  It is the eighth single of his career, and was released in October 2011 as the second single from his album Barefoot Blue Jean Night.

Content
The song is in the key of G major with a moderate tempo, a vocal range of B3-C5 and a main chord pattern of GM7-Em7-C.

Critical reception
Billy Dukes of Taste of Country gave the song three and a half stars out of five, saying that "with somewhat thin lyrical content, the song needs that genuine delivery to push it to colossal levels of greatness," adding that although "Owen doesn't own this as he has his more successful hits," he is "talented enough that his good is another singer's great." Giving it four stars out of five, Bobby Peacock of Roughstock praised the "straightforward but effective lines" and said that it was "overall a very different sound for the usually upbeat Owen, and he pulls it off. "

Music video
The music video was directed by Mason Dixon and premiered in December 2011. It stars Miss USA 2009 Kristen Dalton as his love interest.

Chart performance
"Alone With You" debuted at number 56 on the U.S. Billboard Hot Country Songs chart for the week of October 15, 2011. It also debuted at number 90 on the U.S. Billboard Hot 100 chart for the week of December 24, 2011.
It has since become a number 1 hit.

Year-end charts

Certifications

References

2011 singles
Country ballads
2010s ballads
Jake Owen songs
RCA Records Nashville singles
Songs written by Shane McAnally
Songs written by Catt Gravitt
Song recordings produced by Joey Moi
2011 songs
Songs written by J. T. Harding